Nikola Perić (born 4 February 1992) is a Serbian professional footballer who plays as a goalkeeper for Brasileiro Série C side Altos.

Club career
After starting out at Vojvodina, Perić made his senior debut with Mačva Šabac. He subsequently played for Serbian SuperLiga clubs Hajduk Kula, Voždovac and Jagodina. On 17 July 2015, Perić returned to his parent club Vojvodina, penning a three-year deal. On 26 June 2018, Nikola signed a two-year-deal with Spartak Subotica.

After joining Dinamo Vranje in February 2019, he left the club again at the end of the season.

International career
Perić represented Serbia at the 2011 UEFA European Under-19 Championship, playing the full 90 minutes in all four of his team's games, as they were eliminated by the Czech Republic in the semi-finals. He was also a member of the under-21 team that finished bottom of their group at the 2015 UEFA European Under-21 Championship.

Notes

References

External links
 
 
 

Sportspeople from Šabac
1992 births
Living people
Serbian footballers
Association football goalkeepers
FK Hajduk Kula players
FK Jagodina players
FK Mačva Šabac players
FK Vojvodina players
FK Voždovac players
FK Spartak Subotica players
FK Dinamo Vranje players
FK Proleter Novi Sad players
Serbia under-21 international footballers
Serbia youth international footballers
Serbian SuperLiga players